Piotr Wójcik (born 7 February 1965 in Giżycko) is a retired Polish athlete specialising in the sprint hurdles. He represented his country at one indoor and two outdoor World Championships.

His personal bests are 13.47 seconds in the 110 metres hurdles (Tokyo 1991) and 7.70 seconds in the 60 metres hurdles (Seville 1991).

Competition record

References

1965 births
Living people
People from Giżycko
Polish male hurdlers
World Athletics Championships athletes for Poland
Sportspeople from Warmian-Masurian Voivodeship
20th-century Polish people